Melanoplus furcatus, known generally as the larger fork-tail grasshopper or fork-tailed locust, is a species of spur-throated grasshopper in the family Acrididae. It is found in North America.

References

Melanoplinae
Articles created by Qbugbot
Insects described in 1897